is a Japanese manga series by Yūji Aoki which has been serialized in Weekly Morning since 1990. The series was awarded the 1992 Kodansha Manga Award for general manga and the 1998 Tezuka Osamu Cultural Prize Award for Excellence.

Plot
The protagonist is Tatsuyuki Haibara, a young salaryman, Tokyo-born but living in Osaka. He loses his job at the start of the series and seeks work in the financial sector, but is repeatedly unsuccessful despite his intelligence and aptitude. (Haibara had been pressured into keeping his previous employer afloat with large personal loans, behavior highlighted in his credit rating and regarded as suspicious even though he repaid them.) Exhausting his options, he applies for a position at a small, shady loans company with links to the yakuza. Haibara is hired, but soon realises that his colleagues are little better than loan sharks, quick to intimidate clients who default.

The series follows Haibara's dealings with many and varied customers as he strives to avoid his co-workers' more violent methods.

Other than Haibara, most of the characters are Osakans who speak in heavy Kansai dialect.

References

External links

1990 manga
2007 manga
Kodansha manga
Seinen manga
Shueisha franchises
Shueisha manga
Winner of Kodansha Manga Award (General)
Winner of Tezuka Osamu Cultural Prize (Award for Excellence)
Osaka in fiction